Esmail D. Zanjani is a professor and medical researcher at the University of Nevada, Reno.

His research involves growing human cells within sheep embryos. In March 2007, it was announced that Zanjani had created a human-sheep chimera. Zanjani has stated that his work involves sheep because of the blood-forming systems of sheep and humans are similar.

He has served as president of the International Society for Experimental Hematology.

Education
Ph.D., Experimental Hematology, New York University, 1969
M.S., Biology, New York University, 1966
B.S., Biology, New York University, 1964

References

New Scientist, 17 December 2003 - 'Humanised' organs can be grown in animals
CBS News, February 24, 2005 - Science's Part-Beast, Part-Human

External links
Esmail Zanjani, Ph.D., Emeritus Professor at Molecular Biosciences, University of Nevada, Reno
Esmail Zanjani at Nevada Agricultural Experiment Station

Living people
Year of birth missing (living people)
University of Nevada, Reno faculty
New York University alumni